The 1960–61 Ice hockey Bundesliga season was the third season of the Ice hockey Bundesliga, the top level of ice hockey in Germany. Eight teams participated in the league, and EV Fussen won the championship.

Regular season

Relegation

References

Eishockey-Bundesliga seasons
Bund
Ger